Charles Henry George Howard, 20th Earl of Suffolk, 13th Earl of Berkshire,  (2 March 1906 – 12 May 1941) was an English bomb disposal expert who was also an earl in the Peerage of England, belonging to the ancient Howard family. He was styled Viscount Andover until 1917. He is most famous for being responsible for rescuing a team of French nuclear scientists and transporting the entire world stockpile of heavy water from France to Britain in the face of the imminent French defeat in 1940. He was known by the nicknames Mad Jack, Wild Jack or just Jack and although he was generally referred to in aristocratic circles as Suffolk, he was better known in the workaday world as Jack Howard (more officially Charles Howard).

Early life
He was the son of Henry Howard, 19th Earl of Suffolk, and his American wife, the former Margaret Hyde Leiter (aka "Daisy"), sister of Lady Curzon and daughter of the American businessman Levi Leiter. The 19th Earl was killed in the First World War at the Battle of Istabulat, Iraq.

After leaving the Royal Naval College, Osborne, at 15, he attended Radley College, but quit in 1923 to join the windjammer Mount Stewart as an apprentice officer. After his return from a round-the-world voyage, he was commissioned in the Scots Guards but was later asked to resign from his post by his superiors because of his "wild ways". In 1926, he returned to Australia; where he first worked as a jackaroo and later owned a large farm jointly with Captain McColm, who had been Master of the Mount Stewart.

He enrolled at the University of Edinburgh, graduating three years later with a first-class honours degree in chemistry and pharmacology. In his early twenties, he was elected a Fellow of The Royal Society of Edinburgh. The Nuffield Institute of Medical Research at Oxford University offered him a research post in the area of "explosives and poisons".

Career
As Liaison Officer for the British Department of Scientific and Industrial Research during the Second World War, the Earl of Suffolk and his colleague Major A. V. Golding (1902–1992 ) were posted to Paris. They, and their private secretaries, Eileen Beryl Morden (Suffolk) and Marguerite Nicolle (Golding), left Paris on 10 June 1940 due to the impending Fall of France.

From there they made their way to Bordeaux, where British Embassy representatives introduced them to the master of the British tramp ship , which was one of many standing by to carry refugees to safety. They embarked 33 eminent scientists, with their families. Two more scientists, Lew Kowarski and Hans Halban, arrived with the heavy water.

Then the managing director of the Antwerp Diamond Bank, Paul Timbal, joined, with $10 million worth of gem diamonds. They discovered 600 tons of machine tools in wagons on the quay, which were also loaded.

The Broompark carried them safely to Falmouth, from where a special train took her passengers and cargo to London. The diamonds were placed in the vaults of the Diamond Corporation and most of the heavy water was sent to Windsor Castle, where it was stored alongside the Crown Jewels, until needed.

Howard's approach to his missions earned him the nickname "Mad Jack" or "Wild Jack". Herbert Morrison, Minister of Supply, later described him as "one of the most remarkable young men employed by the Government on dangerous missions.": Morrison told the House of Commons, when in Secret Session, that "A considerable service has been rendered to the Allied cause by the safe arrival of this shipload."

Bomb disposal career and death
Following his return from France, the Earl worked for the Ministry of Supply as a Research Officer learning how to defuse bombs of new and unknown types. The Earl served as part of an unexploded bomb detachment in London during the Blitz. The detachment consisted of himself, his secretary Morden, and his chauffeur, Fred Hards. They called themselves "the Holy Trinity" and they became famed for their prowess in detecting and successfully tackling 34 unexploded bombs with "urbane and smiling efficiency." Morden stood by his side taking notes, as the Earl worked at defusing the bombs.

He looked on each bomb as a new challenge – examining it from all angles, listening to it, his fingers exploring the metal shell and dictating his conclusions to Eileen Morden and the method he proposed to use in disarming the bomb when the time came for her to take shelter. If anything went wrong, then at least others would not make the same mistake. An official report underlined the strain of his work: "On many occasions Lord Suffolk cleared everyone away from the danger area and proceeded to operate alone. Deliberately he exposed himself daily to danger." Jack was a fatalist saying that "If my name is on a bomb, that's it." 

The 35th blew up on Erith Marshes in Kent on 12 May 1941, killing all three. The bomb, a  weapon, was at one of the so-called 'bomb cemeteries', on open ground on the marshes. Bombs were transferred here after being temporarily made safe for transport and then destroyed using controlled explosions.

The bomb had been dropped some six months earlier, the previous autumn and after removal and transfer to the marshes had been at Erith for so long it had been known to the Sappers as 'Old Faithful'. It contained two fuzes, a Type (17) and a Type (50); these two types were in short supply to the Bomb Disposal Sections, intact fuzes being required for instructional purposes and it was to recover the fuzes that the Earl was dealing with the bomb. The Type (17) was a delayed-action fuze containing a clockwork mechanism, while the Type (50) was an anti-handling device containing a motion sensor. Both fuzes had been temporarily made safe so that the bomb could be transferred from the impact site to an open area; the fuzes remained inside the bomb.

The Germans had added a Zus 40 booby trap to some bombs, that detonated when the Type (17) was withdrawn. The Zus 40 was below the other fuze and so was not visible until the obvious fuze was partially withdrawn from its pocket. At lunchtime of 12 May, the Earl had telephoned his office to say that the Type (17) was ticking and that he had sent for an Mk II KIM clock-stopper. By 14:45 this was in place along with a stethoscope and preparations were being made to sterilise the bomb with steam. As two sappers were going to fetch water for the steamer, the bomb exploded. The explosion killed 14 people: the Earl, Hards, Morden (who died in the ambulance) and eleven other people who had been nearby, including five sappers who had been working with the Earl on the bomb. It was later surmised that a Zus 40 may have been triggered as the Earl was removing it.

Personal life
In 1934, he married Chicago-born ballet dancer Minnie Mabel "Mimi" Forde Pigott (21 December 1897 – 22 February 1966); they had three children:
 Michael Howard, 21st Earl of Suffolk (27 March 1935 - 9 August 2022)
 Hon. Maurice David Henry Howard (3 November 1936 – 22 November 2018), married Vicky Summers in 1998.
 Hon. Patrick Greville Howard (born 18 August 1940); married Mary Johnson in 1966.

Accolades, honours and memorials
On 18 July 1941, the London Gazette announced that the King had awarded the Earl of Suffolk a posthumous George Cross "for conspicuous bravery in connection with bomb disposal."

Sir Winston Churchill, in the second volume, "Their Finest Hour", of his book The Second World War reminisced:

A stained glass window designed by Gerald Smith of St. John's Wood was dedicated by Frederick Cockin, the Bishop of Bristol, at a special service on 15 September 1947, at the church of St. John the Baptist, Charlton, in north-west Wiltshire. (Charlton Park and its estate belonged to the Suffolk family.) The stained glass in the central panel above the four main lights shows the Earl's George Cross. The two main figures are the saints George and John of Nepomuk. St. George is trampling on the defeated dragon, a symbol of evil. St. John Nepomuk, a fourteenth-century priest from Bohemia is the Patron saint of Silence. His inclusion in the window is possibly a reference to the great concentration needed in all scientific activity, particularly in bomb disposal, and also (as with St George), to having suffered martyrdom for his beliefs. At the bottom of the panel is the Suffolk family coat of arms. In the right-hand light is a picture of SS Broompark, the vessel in which the Earl made his remarkable escape from Bordeaux in France. The picture shows the moment a German plane appeared above the ship, but flew off without attacking. St Catherine, above, is the Patron saint of Science and also a martyr. Below is St. Francis of Assisi, Patron saint of Birds and Animals – the Earl loved animals and hated hunting and shooting. At the bottom of the two central lights, two scenes are depicted in fascinating detail. One shows work taking place in a laboratory, the other the dangerous business of bomb disposal. Above the bomb disposal squad is the inscription in memory of the Earl and those who died with him. Finally, above the scene in the laboratory is displayed a poem by John Masefield, Poet Laureate of the United Kingdom, written by him upon hearing the news of Jack Howard's death:

In 1973, the BBC based a television drama series on the life of the Earl. Ronald Pickup played the leading role in The Dragon's Opponent. The Earl has a role in Michael Ondaatje's novel, The English Patient.

References

Further reading
 Freeman, Kerin (2015). The Civilian Bomb Disposing Earl – Jack Howard & Bomb Disposal in WW2, Pen & Sword, UK 
 Hissey, Terry (2008). Come if ye Dare – The Civil Defence George Crosses, Civil Defence Assn.

External links
 BBC: The People's War: The Earl and the Secretary 
 

1906 births
1941 deaths
Charles
Charles
English people of American descent
English people of Swiss descent
Charles Howard, 20th Earl of Suffolk
British civilians killed in World War II
Bomb disposal personnel
People educated at Radley College
British recipients of the George Cross
Fellows of the Royal Society of Edinburgh
Alumni of the University of Edinburgh
People educated at the Royal Naval College, Osborne
Deaths by airstrike during World War II
English chemists